Joseph Vincent Kulbacki (March 1, 1938 – November 26, 2012) was an American author, vintner, entrepreneur, and  American football halfback, in college for Purdue and in Professional Football in the American Football League for the Buffalo Bills.

Kulbacki was born in Ridgway, Pennsylvania.  He played college football at Purdue University and was drafted in 16th round of the 1960 NFL Draft by the Washington Redskins, but chose to play for the AFL's Bills in their first season, 1960.

Kulbacki was also author of America...A Nation That's Lost Its Way, a conservative critique of modern American politics and society in the context of its Judeo-Christian values, and paralleling the rise and fall of past civilizations, particularly Ancient Rome. he died in 2012.

See also
 Other American Football League players

External links
 Kulbacki's photo

References

1938 births
2012 deaths
People from Ridgway, Pennsylvania
American football halfbacks
Players of American football from Pennsylvania
Purdue Boilermakers football players
Buffalo Bills players
American Football League players